Girl 6 is a 1996 American black comedy film produced and directed by Spike Lee. The film stars Theresa Randle, Isaiah Washington, and Lee. Suzan-Lori Parks wrote the screenplay, making it the first film directed by Lee in which he did not write for it. Directors Quentin Tarantino and Ron Silver make cameo appearances as film directors at a pair of interesting auditions.

The accompanying soundtrack is composed entirely of songs written by Prince. The film was screened in the Un Certain Regard section of the 1996 Cannes Film Festival.

Plot
Judy, a young and timid African American aspiring actress living in New York, attends an audition with Quentin Tarantino for, as he describes, "the greatest romantic, African-American film ever made". Initially doing quite well, Judy becomes very apprehensive and defiant when asked to undress herself. Eventually, she reluctantly complies, revealing her breasts. However, becoming quickly overwhelmed with guilt, she storms out.

After discovering what happened, her agent Murray, having worked hard to get her an audition with such a prestigious director, furiously drops her from his roster of clients. Her melodramatic acting coach also criticizes her apathy towards her acting art and the entertainment industry overall. When Judy explains why she left the audition, the coach replies that she should have just followed Tarantino's directions. This, topped with Judy's current financial issues preventing her from paying her coach for her services, results in Judy being dropped from her roster of clients as well.

Now unable to secure regular acting work, Judy tries various jobs. One night while returning home from her part-time job as a nightclub cocktail waitress on a crowded subway, Judy encounters a newspaper want-ad for a "friendly phone line" and another with the headline "mo money, mo money, mo money", circling both. At a call center specializing in customer service and phone sex, Judy meets Lil, who seems assertive but friendly, and both click during her interview. Judy then attends interviews with other phone sex companies, including one run by a stripper, who offers her the opportunity to work unrestricted in her own home. She would, however, have to have her own private telephone line, which she currently does not have. She still decides to keep this opportunity in mind for future reference.

Ultimately, Lil hires Judy as a phone sex operator at the call center. During orientation, Lil explains that although most girls on the team are African-American, unless the caller requests otherwise, they should always sound Caucasian, and Judy (dubbed "Girl 6") immediately settles into her new job. Her sports memorabilia-obsessed cousin and best friend Jimmy, who lives in the same complex as her, warns her about the dangers of phone sex. Also, while running errands, Judy occasionally sees her kleptomaniac ex-boyfriend, explaining her current occupation.

Thanks to her new job, Judy sheds her former "innocent girl" image for a sexually bolder attitude and personality. She connects with "Bob Regular", who calls the phone sex company daily strictly for her, to which Judy adapts the nickname "Lovely", especially for him. Unlike other callers, "Bob" simply converses with her cordially, explaining that he moved from Arizona and lives close to her. They agree to meet up at Coney Island amusement park, during her lunch break, but when he misses their meeting, a depressed Judy returns to work.

Immediately, a very frightening and obscene man strangely calls Judy and disrespects her. Lil, monitoring her call, disconnects and blocks him, reminding her to be more careful with the men that call in. The man, however, oddly reconnects to Judy's phone, disrespecting her even further. Eventually, Judy suddenly becomes very angry and bitter, and upon discovering her breakdown, Lil temporarily fires her, telling her to fix herself before returning. Judy, however, now able to get a private line, decides to continue her phone sex career at home. Judy also becomes more sexually aroused and comfortable from the callers in her private line.

One night, she goes into a very explicit and perverse S&M and snuff related conversation, soon realizing that the caller is the same exact man who had been disrespecting her earlier. Though Judy repeatedly disconnects him, he continually calls back, graphically describing what turns him on. When Judy eventually relents, telling him to cease, he then shockingly reveals her exact residence, and is delighted when Judy finally snaps at him. Immediately afterwards, she frightfully runs to Jimmy's house for shelter. Before leaving the phone sex career behind, she reconciles with her ex-boyfriend.

Now living in Los Angeles,  Judy attends an audition with Ron Silver which almost parallels her experience with Tarantino. She decides to leave the audition; however this time, having a different approach, she happily walks down the Hollywood Walk of Fame, having reclaimed her dignity.

Cast

Reception
Girl 6 received mostly mixed-to-negative reviews during its release. On Rotten Tomatoes, the film holds an approval rating of 39% rating based on 36 reviews, with an average rating of 4.80/10. The site's critics consensus reads, "Girl 6 has a compelling star, a Prince soundtrack, and Spike Lee's vivid style – and, unfortunately, a story that's never as compelling or insightful as it needs to be."

Box office
The film grossed $4,939,939 domestically.

Home media

The film was released on VHS on August 6, 1996 and on DVD on March 7, 2006.

Soundtrack

References

External links
 
 
 

1996 films
1996 comedy films
1990s English-language films
1990s black comedy films
20th Century Fox films
40 Acres and a Mule Filmworks films
African-American films
African-American comedy films
American black comedy films
American independent films
Films about actors
Films directed by Spike Lee
Films set in Los Angeles
Films set in New York City
Films with screenplays by Suzan-Lori Parks
Fox Searchlight Pictures films
Films about telephony
1990s American films